Asymmetrical trichlorotrifluoroethane, also called 1,1,1-Trichloro-2,2,2-trifluoroethane or CFC-113a is a chlorofluorocarbon (CFC). It has the formula .

Environmental effects 
Ozone depletion

A team of researchers at the University of East Anglia analysed unpolluted air samples from Tasmania dating from the period 1978 to 2012. They concluded that the CFC's they studied had started entering the atmosphere from anthropogenic sources in the 1960s and that while the abundance of certain CFCs had decreased, owing to the Montreal Protocol, the abundance of CFC-113a in the atmosphere was still growing. Its source remained uncertain, but production of hydrofluorocarbons in East Asia was suspected by some. Between 2012 and 2017, concentrations of the gas jumped by 40 percent.

See also
 1,1,2-Trichloro-1,2,2-trifluoroethane

References

Chlorofluorocarbons
Greenhouse gases
Refrigerants
Trifluoromethyl compounds
Trichloromethyl compounds